Age 17 is a 2013 Swiss drama film written and directed by Filippo Demarchi.

The short film included in the DVD Boys On Film 12 – Confession.

Synopsis 
Matteo is a 17-year-old boy who comes to the realization that he is in love with Don Massimo, a young priest of the village that leads the marching band in which Matteo plays the drum. He sees in Massimo a person willing to listen to his fears and desires. For the first time in his life, Matteo feels ready to open up to someone.

Cast 
 Fabio Foiada as Matteo
 Ignazio Oliva as Don Massimo
 Laura Minazzi as Nadine
 Kevin Martinetti as Firat

Participation in international festivals and awards 
2013:
 Festival Tous Ecrans – 19th Geneva International Film Festival (Switzerland) – RTS award for Best International Short : acquisition
 Internationale Kurzfilmtage Winterthur (Switzerland)
 Festival du film de Vendôme (France)

2014:
 18th Sofia International Film Festival (Bulgaria) – Swiss film Award, nomination best shortfilm 2014
 26th European First Film Festival – Festival premier plans d'Angers (France)
 32st International Film Festival of Uruguay (Uruguay)
 Curta Cinema (Rio de Janeiro, Brazil)
 FreshWave, International Short Film Festival (Hong Kong) – International Association of Film and Television Schools (CILECT)
 Inside Out – Toronto LGBT Film Festival (Canada)
 Internationales Kurzfilm Festival Hamburg: IKFF (Germany)
 Merlinka Festival International Queer Film (Serbia)
 MWFF, Montreal World Film Festival (Canada)
 Palm Spring – ShortFest (USA)
 Schweizer Jugendfilmtage – Festival Ciné Jeunesse Suisse (Switzerland)
 Solothurner Filmtage – Journées de Soleure (Switzerland)
 Tel Aviv International Student Film Festiva (Israel)
 Queer Lisboa 18 – International Queer Film Festival (Portugal)
 UK Film Festival, London

2015:
 38 Festival du Film Court en Plein Air de Grenoble (France)
 FIPA, Festival International des Programmes Audiovisuels de Biarritz (France)

References

External links 
 

2013 films
2013 short films
2010s Italian-language films
Swiss short films
Swiss drama films
Swiss LGBT-related films
LGBT-related short films
LGBT-related drama films
Gay-related films
2013 LGBT-related films